DreamWorks Channel, commonly known as DreamWorks, is a pay television network owned and operated by the NBCUniversal International Networks division of NBCUniversal, a division of Comcast. First launched in Southeast Asia on 1 August 2015, it expanded to the rest of Asia as well as Europe, Africa, Oceania and Latin America. Its programming is dominated by productions from DreamWorks Animation.

Its counterpart in the United States is Universal Kids, which launched on 9 September 2017, with the rights to DreamWorks Animation's programming in the country also handled by Netflix and other local networks.

History

As a standalone TV Channel 
DreamWorks Animation announced plans to launch its own TV channel on 9 December 2014 starting in Asia, rolling out over 19 countries in the second half of 2015. Singapore-based broadcaster HBO Asia was contracted to handle marketing, sales and technical services for the channel in Southeast Asia. The studio's first foray into television channel operations in any part of the world was represented with the launch of its first dedicated channel on 1 August 2015 in Thailand through a joint venture through with CTH.

A Middle East and North Africa feed of the channel launched on 1 August 2016 in partnership with the beIN Channels Network.

The channel was placed under the NBCU International executive vice president of Lifestyle and Kids, Duccio Donati, in August 2017, following the NBCU/Comcast takeover of DreamWorks Animation. This paired the channel with E! international channels and NBCU Lifestyle Channel content. On 1 January 2018, NBCUniversal International Networks took over HBO Asia's role with DreamWorks Channel in Southeast Asia.

The channel launched on KPN in the Netherlands on 23 July 2019.

The channel launched as a one-month pop-up channel in Australia via Foxtel on channel 700 throughout June 2020 and returned as a regular 24/7 network the following year.

The Sub-Saharan African feed of the channel originally launched on StarTimes on 3 August 2020, but closed/shut down on 17 February 2022 and was supplemented by Nickelodeon on StarTimes ON in July 2022. MultiChoice and NBCUIN jointly announced on 8 March 2022 that the channel would launch on DStv a week later on 18 March. On its launch, the channel took over the service channel number slot previously held by Disney XD which was shut down on 1 October 2020 and supplement eToonz alongside PBS Kids. The Sub-Saharan African channel is available on the DStv Compact, DStv Compact Plus and DStv Premium subscription packages in South Africa and on the DStv Premium and DStv Compact Plus subscription packages in the rest of Africa, although the channel was made available on the lower-tiered DStv Family and DStv Access subscription packages until 18 April to promote Team Zenko Go, The Bad Guys and The Boss Baby: Back in the Crib. From 27 June to 15 July 2022, the channel was made available on DStv Family alongside Disney Channel to promote Kung Fu Panda: The Dragon Knight and Illumination's Minions: The Rise of Gru.

The Philippines feed of the channel launched via Cignal on 11 September 2021, with aired productions dubbed in the Filipino language. It was also launched on SkyCable in mid-November that same year, though SkyCable uses its original English feed instead. Like the Sub-Saharan African DStv channel feed, it replaced on launch the country channel feed of Disney Channel, which shut down on the same date as the Southeast Asian Disney Channel feeds, i.e. on 1 October.

Universal+ launch with DreamWorks 
The channel and Universal+ launched in Spain with two television providers Movistar+ and Orange on 21 February 2021.

The Indian feed of the channel was launched in English via Jio TV on 25 November 2021.

The Latin America feed of the channel was launched on 31 March 2022.

DreamWorks Channel Africa's programming are currently available to stream on Universal+ which launched as an on-demand service on DStv Catch Up and DStv App on 14 October 2022.

The channel was launched along with Universal+ in France on SFR on 17 November 2022 on  Prime Video Channels in 6 December 2022 and on Bouygues Telecom in 8 December 2022.

Astro launch
The DreamWorks channel officially launched broadcasting on the Astro Malaysia pay TV platform on 15 January 2023 via Channel 622 (HD) until 31 January 2023 and will stop broadcasting for free and become part of the Kids Pack, starting 1 February 2023. On the same day, after a month later on February 1, 2023, DreamWorks Channel changed its channel number to Channel 612 (HD) as a replacement for TA-DAA! which closed on February 1, 2023.

Programming
The content on the channel mainly consists of productions from the libraries of DreamWorks Animation Television and DreamWorks Classics including some of the former's content originally produced for Netflix; films and specials from DreamWorks Animation, Illumination and sometimes from third parties only broadcasts in the international versions.

Programming blocks
DreamWorks Junior - This block is composed of shows targeting preschool-age children every morning and is a direct competitor to Paramount Global's Nick Jr., The Walt Disney Company's Disney Junior and Warner Bros. Discovery's Cartoonito. Programs currently seen in this block include Guess with Jess, Raa Raa the Noisy Lion and 3-2-1 Penguins!.

Current programming

Future programming

Versions

See also
Peacock
Universal Kids, this network's American equivalent, formerly Sprout.
Sky Kids, this network's British equivalent, owned by Comcast’s Sky Group.

Notes

References

External links
 (Asia)
 (Worldwide)

Children's television networks
English-language television stations in Australia
Portuguese-language television stations in Brazil
Spanish-language television stations
Television channels and stations established in 2015
Television stations in Algeria
Television stations in Brazil
Television stations in Egypt
Television stations in Ghana
Television stations in Hong Kong
Television stations in Iraq
Television channels in Jordan
Television stations in Kuwait
Television stations in Lebanon
Television stations in Libya
Television stations in Malaysia
Television stations in Morocco
Television channels in the Netherlands
Television stations in the Philippines
Television stations in Saudi Arabia
Television stations in Singapore
Television stations in South Africa
Television channels in South Korea
Television stations in Spain
Television stations in the State of Palestine
Television channels in Syria
Television stations in Thailand
Television stations in Tunisia
Television stations in the United Arab Emirates
Television stations in Yemen
Universal Kids
Universal Networks International
NBCUniversal networks